Tatyana Sarycheva (born February 7, 1949) is a former volleyball player for the USSR. Born in New York City, she competed for the Soviet Union at the 1968 and 1972 Summer Olympics.

References

External links 
 

1949 births
Living people
Sportspeople from New York City
Soviet women's volleyball players
Olympic volleyball players of the Soviet Union
Olympic gold medalists for the Soviet Union
Olympic medalists in volleyball
Volleyball players at the 1968 Summer Olympics
Volleyball players at the 1972 Summer Olympics
Medalists at the 1968 Summer Olympics
Medalists at the 1972 Summer Olympics